Aung Min Thein was a prominent Burmese film director and artist.

Filmography
1991: We Love in Myanmar
1991: Everything in My Heart
?: Love is Like a Breeze
?: Smile and Relax

References

1961 births
2007 deaths
Burmese artists
Burmese film directors
People from Mandalay Region
Deaths from liver cancer